Political Liberalism is a 1993 book by the American philosopher John Rawls, an update to his earlier A Theory of Justice (1971).  In it, he attempts to show that his theory of justice is not a "comprehensive conception of the good" but is instead compatible with a liberal conception of the role of justice, namely, that government should be neutral between competing conceptions of the good. Rawls tries to show that his two principles of justice, properly understood, form a "theory of the right" (as opposed to a theory of the good) which would be supported by all reasonable individuals, even under conditions of reasonable pluralism. The mechanism by which he demonstrates this is called "overlapping consensus". Here he also develops his idea of public reason.

An expanded edition of the book was published in 2005. It includes an added introduction, the essay "The Idea of Public Reason Revisited" (1997) – some 60 pages – and an index to the new material.

Reception
A 1993 review by Stuart Hampshire writes that:

Samuel Freeman (1994) concludes that:  

Fuat  Gursozlu  (2014) notes a condition for sustainable liberalism identified in the volume:

See also

 American philosophy

References

External links
 

1993 non-fiction books
American non-fiction books
Columbia University Press books
English-language books
Legal ethics
Political philosophy literature
Works by John Rawls